Bhutanitis ludlowi, the Ludlow's Bhutan swallowtail, is a species of butterfly in the family Papilionidae, endemic to Bhutan and recently recorded in India. It belongs to the subfamily Parnassiinae subfamily which also contains the Apollo butterflies.

History
Until recently, Bhutanitis ludlowi was poorly known, and despite recent studies, its biology and distribution are still not entirely known. The taxon was originally known from a series of five specimens collected in Bhutan during 1933-1934 by the botanists Frank Ludlow and George Sheriff. Four of these specimens were referred to in the type description, which contained little information on the species' biology other than they were collected at an altitudinal range of 2000–2200 metres in forest.

In 1992, Chou claimed that a specimen of B. ludlowi had been collected in Yunnan and had been lodged in a Chinese collection.  Although this record was questioned by subsequent authors, a later publication by Chou (2000) did not provide additional information. Although Chou (2000) illustrated a specimen, it was later determined to be a retouched photo of the type specimen in the British Museum (Natural History). As no specimen has demonstrably been collected in China, Bollino and Racheli (2012) argued that the record was a misidentification of Bhutanitis lidderdalii spinosa.

In August 2009, Karma Wangdi, a Bhutanese forestry officer, collected a specimen of B. ludlowi in the Bumdeling Wildlife Sanctuary, located in Bhutan's remote Trashiyangtse Valley. This specimen provided the first unambiguous evidence in some 75 years that the species was extant. In August 2011, some mating [IUCN] pairs of B. ludlowi were sighted and captured at Bumdelling Wildlife Sanctuary in Bhutan by a research team from Bhutan in collaboration with the Butterfly Society of Japan (BSJ) and NHK Japan (Bhutan government official release 2011; Kuenzang 2011). Amazingly, the expedition sighted their first B. ludlowi on August 12, the same date that Ludlow and Sheriff took the first specimen in 1933. Bhutanitis ludlowi subsequently became the national butterfly of Bhutan.

Biology
The 2011 expedition also revealed considerable biological information about B. ludlowi (Choden, 2011). Its host plant is Aristolochia griffithi, which is also utilised as a host plant by other Bhutanitis taxa. Bhutanitis ludlowi eggs are smaller than in other Bhutanitis and are laid on top of each other in a stacked pile arrangement. Video footage of live adults (external links 3 and 4) show that their flight is rapid with a deep wingbeat and frequent gliding. The forewings provide all propulsion, while the hindwings are unpowered during normal flight and trail behind the butterfly. Unlike many swallowtail butterflies, B. ludlowi does not continuously flutter its wings while feeding. Viburnum cylindricum flowers were the most commonly used adult food source.

In 2012, a photograph was taken of a live specimen of B. ludlowi in or adjacent to the Eaglenest Wildlife Sanctuary, Arunachal Pradesh (Padmanabhan, 2012). This record comes from an area where Bhutanitis lidderdalii lidderdalii also occurs, suggesting these taxa are sympatric, or at least nearly so (based on data from photographs of B. lidderdalii shown on the Indian Foundation for Butterflies, Butterflies of India website).

As so few specimens are known, B. ludlowi is rarely illustrated. It is similar in appearance to the allied B. lidderdalii but has broader wings with the transverse bands grey instead of white (Chou, 2000). The distribution of both B. ludlowi and B. lidderdalii may overlap in Bhutan and Yunnan, China (Chou 2000), although it is unknown whether they co-occur in the same habitat.

Status
As with all other members of the genus Bhutanitis, B. ludlowi is listed on Appendix II of CITES, restricting any international trade. As of 2011, there were no reports of the species having entered trade, but it is highly sought after by collectors. Its most recent IUCN assessment is vulnerable (Gimenez Dixon, 1996). Although collecting butterflies in Bhutan is prohibited, the BSJ is building butterfly rearing capacity with the Bhutanese government for B. ludlowi and other species. Sustainable commercial rearing of this species has potential to eliminate the need for specimens to be continually harvested from wild populations, or to at least reduce the impact of harvesting so it is negligible. As with similar butterfly ranching programs in Indonesia and Papua New Guinea, sustainable harvesting may also provide wealth to remote communities with few other sources of legitimate income.

References

 Choden, K. (2011). New findings on Ludlow's Bhutan Glory. August 27, 2011. 
 Chou, Y. (ed.)  1994.  Zhongguo die lei zhi / Zhou Yao zhu bian = Monographia rhopalocerorum sinensium = Monograph of Chinese butterflies. Henan ke xue ji shu chu ban she, Zhengzhou shi.
 Chou, I. (ed.) 2000. Monographia Rhopalocerorum Sinensium (Monograph of Chinese Butterflies). Revised Edition. Henan Scientific and Technological Publishing House, China. Two volumes.
 Chou, L. 1992. A study on the rare butterflies of the genus Bhutantis (Lepidoptera: Papilionidae) with descriptions of two new species. Entomotaxonomia 14(1): 48-54, 1 plate.
 Coote, L. 2000. CITES identification guide - Butterflies: Guide to the Identification of Butterfly Species Controlled Under the Convention on International Trade in Endangered Species of Wild Fauna and Flora. . Downloaded 5 March 2010.
 Bhutan Government official release 2011. First ever evidence of Ludlow's Bhutan Swallowtail mating. Wildlife Conservation Division, Ministry of Agriculture and Forests, Royal Government of Bhutan, August 17, 2011.  
 Kuenzang Choden 2011. New findings on Ludlow's Bhutan Glory. Bhutan Times, August 27, 2011. 
 Padmanabhan, S. 2012. The butterfly effect. The Hindu, 30 December 2012. 
 Indian Foundation for Butterflies. Bhutanitis lidderdalii Atkinson, 1873 - Bhutan Glory. Butterflies of India website. 
 Bollino, M and Racheli, T. 2012. Supplement 20. Parnassiinae (Partim) Parnassiini (Partim); Luehdorfiini; Zerynthiini (Lepidoptera: Papilionidae). In Bauer, E. and Frankenbach, T. (eds). Butterflies of the World. Goecke & Evers: Keltern.

External links

 TOL Taxonomic discussion. (Rare) photograph
  Questions the validity of specimen figured by Chou (1994).
  NHK footage of the Bhutan-Japan expedition, showing the initial Ludlow collection in the British Museum and flight of adult B. ludlowi at natural speed
  Shows slowed footage of live adults.

L
Endemic fauna of Bhutan
Butterflies of Asia
Insects of Bhutan
Butterflies described in 1942
Vulnerable fauna of Asia
Taxonomy articles created by Polbot